Antonio Pelayo is an artist, illustrator, and event producer who focuses on the Latino community of Southern California. He is also an inker at the Walt Disney Animation Studios Ink & Paint Department.

Biography

Early life
Pelayo was born in Glendale, California. As a child he relocated to central Mexico alongside his family. He was raised as a Jehovah's Witness, and as a teenager took an active role in the community, which allowed him to lead congregations of several hundred people at a very young age. He spent much of his time in his youth honing his craft as an artist. After returning to Glendale, Pelayo's family settled near the Walt Disney Studios in Burbank. Pelayo would often daydream of being an illustrator at Disney Studios. As a teenager, Pelayo took a temporary job at Disney Studios.

Event organization 
Early on in his career, Pelayo exhibited his own work in different venues across Los Angeles. Quickly building a network of artists friends, made him realize he could branch out on his individual practice and began to produce his own art showcases featuring artists, performers, designers and creatives from the Latino community of Southern California. He has hosted "El Velorio," an annual event since 2009 that converges with Dia de Los Muertos festivities.  Other events Pelayo regularly produces include "La Bulla," a celebration of Luchadores, and "Tatuaje," a showcase of Chicano tattoo art.

Exhibitions

Solo exhibitions 

 2017 "Retrospective Show" Plaza de la Raza.
 2014 "Untitled" Disney Animation Studios.
 2012 "Mi Familia" LAUNCH Gallery.
 2002 "Silver Lining" Disney Animation Studios.

Group exhibitions 

 2019 “Brand 47: Works on Paper, Brand Library Glendale.
 2019 “REMIX” Gabba Gabba Gallery.
 2019 “On Their Backs”  Fellows of Contemporary Art. 
 2019 “The Art of Labor” Ave 50 Gallery.
 2019 “Adopt the Arts fundraiser art Auction” 
 2018 "Remember Me" Ontario Museum of History and Art. 
2018 "PIALLI" CuratorLove. 
 2018 "Noche de Calaveras" Mayfair Hotel.
 2018 "Voces" Disney Animation Studios
 2018 "Remix the art of music" Gabba Gabba Gallery.
2017 "El Velorio" Plaza de La Raza.
2017 "LA Story" Museum of Latin American Art. 
2017 "Los Four Meet Los 40" La Bodega Gallery.
2017 "Snow White Exhibit”  Spessart Museum, Germany.
2017 “Snow White Exhibit”   Brandts Museum, Odense, Denmark.
2017 "The Nature of Movement, Drawn from Life” Musee Art Ludique, Paris, France.
2017 "Drawn from Life” Miraikan Museum, Tokyo, Japan.
"Art of Story Telling” The Nordic Watercolor Museum, Skarhamn Sweden.
2016 "Water is Life" Known Gallery.
2016 "Tatuaje" Museo Casa Leon Trotsky, Ciudad de Mexico.
2016 "The Velasco" hosted by Edward James Olmos.
2016 "Art for Hearts" Robert Berman Gallery, Bergamot Station.
2016 "Contemporary Nostalgia" Pelayo & Galieote Launch Gallery.
2016 "Faces & People" Don Lucas Paris, France.
2016 "The Coaster Show" La Luz de Jesus Gallery.
2016 "Dia de los Muertos" Marcas Gallery.
2015 "Drawn From Life" National Art Museum of Beijing, China. 
2015 “Drawn From Life” China Art Museum Shanghai.
2015 "Fotos y Recuerdos" Museum of Latin American Art. 
2015 "LAMAG Group Show" Barnsdall Gallery.
2015 "Tarfest" Group Show Troika.
2015 "DTLA Dark Nights" Nokia Center.
2014 "Hispanic Heritage" Latino Art Museum, Pomona.
2014 "Los Angeles is Eclectic" Museum of Latin American Art. 
2014 "Crossing Borders" University Art Gallery, CSUDH. 
2014 "Monochromart" LAUNCH Gallery.
2014 "Like Father Like Son" Burbank Creative Art Center.
2014 "El Velorio" Plaza de la Raza.
2013"Snow White & The Seven Dwarfs" The Norman Rockwell Museum, Stockbridge, MA.
2013 "El Velorio" Plaza de la Raza.
2013 "Y Ahora Que", Latino Art Museum, Pomona.
2013 "Open Show" Ontario Museum of History and Art. 
2013 "Riverside Art Museum” Group show, Riverside. 
2012 "Snow White & The Seven Dwarfs" Walt Disney Museum, San Francisco.
2012 "El Velorio" KGB Gallery.
2012 "De Colores" Santa Paula Museum, Santa Paula.
2012 "Group Show" CCAA Museum Of Art, Rancho Cucamonga.
2011 "El Velorio" KGB Gallery.
2011 "Love Vibes" Ave 50 Gallery.
2011 "Open Call" Barnsdall Gallery.
2011 "Small Works" Freemont Gallery.
2011 "Dia De Los Muertos" Hollywood Forever.
2011 "El Buen Pastor Project" UDG, Guanajuato Mexico.
2011 "Adelante" Forest Lawn Museum, LA.
2011 "De Colores" Santa Paula Museum, Santa Paula.
2011 "Group Show" CCAA Museum of Art.
2010 “Once Upon a Time” Cinderella,  The Australian Centre for the Moving Image, Melbourne, Australia.
2010 "El Velorio" Sabor Lounge.
2010 "Group Show" Gene Autry Museum.
2010 "Invitational Show" Ontario Museum of History and Art. 
2009 The Hangaram Art Gallery, Seoul Arts Center, Seoul, South Korea Helsinki Art Museum, Helsinki, Finland.
2009 “Once Upon a Time” Cinderella,  NOMA New Orleans Museum of Art, New Orleans.
2009 "Summer Group Show" Lawrence Asher Gallery .
2008 “Snow White & The Seven Dwarfs” Disney California Adventure, Anaheim, CA.
2008 "Anniversary Show" Crewest Gallery.
2008 "International Art Festival" Asto Museum, LA.
2008 "Nuestra Historia" Riverside Metropolitan Museum, Riverside.
2007 "Figures A Group Show", Mendenhall Sobieski Gallery.
2007 "Represent Represent", URB Gallery.
2007 "C.H.E.E.T.A." Desert Art Center, Palm Springs.
2007 "Expresions" Expressions from Mexico Gallery, San Diego.
2007 "Group Show" Brand Library, Glendale.
2007 "International Art Festival" Museum of Modern Art, Yerevan Armenia.

 2006 "15th Lantern Festival" Doizaki North Gallery, Los Angeles.
 2006 "La Batalla" Subject Matter Gallery, Costa Mesa.
 2006 "Iron Eye" Scion Installation, Culver City.
 2006 "Tarfest" Korean Cultural Center, LA.
 "Tarfest Juried Show" Craft & Folk Art Museum, LA.
 2005 "INRI" Curated by RETNA.
 2005 "Iron Eye"  Curated by RETNA.

Art Fairs 

 2013 LA Art Show, Los Angeles Convention Center.
 2012 LA Art Show, Los Angeles Convention Center.
 2007 FADA, Barker Hangar.

References

Living people
American illustrators
Year of birth missing (living people)